Clive Walford (born October 21, 1991) is a former American football tight end. He played college football for the University of Miami and was drafted by the Oakland Raiders in the third round of the 2015 NFL Draft.

Early years
Walford attended Glades Central High School in Belle Glade, Florida, where he was a 3-sport star in football, basketball, and track. One of his teammates on the Glades Central football team was Buffalo Bills' wide receiver Kelvin Benjamin. He was rated by Rivals.com as a three-star recruit. In July 2009, he committed to the University of Miami to play college football for the Hurricanes football team. Walford also competed in track & field, posting personal-bests of 1.88 meters (6-2) in the high jump and 6.08 meters (19-11) in the long jump.

College career
After he was redshirted as a true freshman in 2010, Walford played in all 12 games with eight starts as a redshirt freshman in 2011. He finished his freshman season with 18 receptions for 172 yards and a touchdown. As a sophomore in 2012, Walford had 25 receptions for 451 yards and four touchdowns over 12 games, of which he started five. As a junior in 2013, he started 12 of 13 games, recording 34 receptions for 454 yards and two touchdowns. Walford returned as a starter his senior season.

Professional career
On January 2, 2015, it was announced that Walford had accepted his invitation to play in the 2016 Senior Bowl. Throughout the week leading up to the Senior Bowl, Walford had impressive practices and displayed his pass catching and blocking for NFL scouts. He routinely beat linebackers and safeties and coverage and was commended by NFL analysts Daniel Jeremiah, Chase Goodbread, and Mike Mayock. Mayock claimed Walford was, "the most explosive tight end in this year's draft." and, "All he did (this week) was enhance his value." Mayock also stated Walford was pressing Maxx Williams to be the first tight end selected in the upcoming draft. On January 24, 2017, Walford caught one pass for a ten-yard gain as the South lost to the North 13–34. He was one of 19 tight ends to be invited to the NFL combine and he completed all of the required combine and positional drills. His performance at the combine was described by analysts as "mediocre" and his 40-yard dash time was called "pedestrian". On April 1, 2015, Walford opted to participate at Miami Hurricanes' pro day, along with Phillip Dorsett, Duke Johnson, Ereck Flowers, Anthony Chickillo, Denzel Perryman, Jon Feliciano, Shane McDermott, Thurston Armbrister, Olsen Pierre, Ladarius Gunter, Jake Heaps, and three other teammates. Due to a hamstring injury, Walford chose to only perform positional drills for the team representatives and scouts from all 32 NFL teams, that included head coaches Todd Bowles (Jets), Sean Payton (Saints), and Mike Tomlin (Steelers). During the pre-draft process, he had private visit and workouts with the Miami Dolphins, Buffalo Bills, Kansas City Chiefs, Pittsburgh Steelers, Atlanta Falcons, and Green Bay Packers. He had private visits or workouts with a few teams, including the Kansas City Chiefs. At the conclusion of the pre-draft process, Walford was projected to be a second or third round pick. He was ranked the second best tight end prospect in the draft by NFL analysts Charles Davis, Mike Mayock, Lance Zierlein, NFLDraftScout.com, and Sports Illustrated.

Oakland Raiders
The Oakland Raiders selected Walford in the third round (68th overall) of the 2015 NFL Draft. He was the second tight end selected in the draft behind Maxx Williams (second round, 55th overall). The Raiders also selected his Miami Hurricanes' teammate Jon Feliciano in the fourth round (128th overall).

2015 season: Rookie year
On June 16, 2015, the Raiders signed Walford to a four-year, $3.34 million contract that includes a signing bonus of $795,504.

Throughout his first training camp with the Oakland Raiders, Walford competed with Mychal Rivera, Lee Smith, Brian Leonhardt, and Gabe Holmes for the job as the starting tight end. He had an impressive performance during the Raiders' organized team activities and mini camp, but missed the beginning of training camp with a hamstring injury. Walford missed the Raiders' last three preseason games after he suffered a knee injury. Head coach Jack Del Rio named Walford the third tight end on the Raiders' depth chart to begin the season, behind Lee Smith and Mychal Rivera.

Walford made his NFL debut in the season-opener against the Cincinnati Bengals and caught his first NFL reception on a one-yard pass from Derek Carr during the 33-13 loss. During Week 5 against the Denver Broncos, Walford caught a 33-yard pass in a 16-10 loss. The 33-yard reception was the longest of his rookie season. On October 25, 2015, Walford earned his first NFL start and made two receptions for 42 yards as the Raiders defeated the San Diego Chargers by a score 37-29. He also scored his first NFL touchdown while being covered by Chargers' cornerback Jimmy Wilson, catching a 23-yard pass from Derek Carr in the second quarter. On December 6, 2015, he caught a season-high five passes for a season-high 53 receiving yards during a 34-20 loss to the Kansas City Chiefs.

Walford finished his rookie season with a total of 28 receptions for 329 yards and three touchdowns in 16 games and two starts.

2016 season
Entering training camp, Walford was expected to be the starting tight end. Although he surpassed Mychal Rivera on the depth chart, he was named the backup to Lee Smith. Smith remained the starting tight end due to his superior blocking ability.

On September 18, 2016, Walford caught a season-high six passes for 58 yards and scored a 31-yard touchdown during a 35-28 loss to the Atlanta Falcons. During a Week 4 matchup at the Baltimore Ravens, he made his first start of the season and caught two receptions for 23 yards in a narrow 28-27 victory. Unfortunately, Walford left the game after suffering a knee injury and missed the Raiders' Week 5 matchup against the San Diego Chargers. During the game, Lee Smith suffered a fracture to his lower leg and was placed on injured reserve for the rest of the season on October 5, 2016, which expanded Walford's role. On November 27, 2016, Walford caught three passes for 43 yards and a touchdown as the Raiders defeated the Carolina Panthers 35-32. His touchdown reception was on a 12-yard pass from Derek Carr to tie the game in the fourth quarter.

Walford finished the 2016 season with 33 receptions for 359 receiving yards and 3 touchdowns in eight starts and 15 games.

2017 season
During the offseason, the Raiders and offensive coordinator Bill Musgrave mutually parted ways and he was replaced by Todd Downing. Walford competed with Jared Cook, Lee Smith, Gabe Holmes, Ryan O'Malley, Cooper Helfet, and Pharaoh Brown throughout training camp for a job as the starting tight end. Head coach Jack Del Rio named Walford the Raiders' third tight end behind Cook and Smith to start the regular season.

Through the first 12 games, Walford was limited to three receptions for 10 yards. On December 3, 2017, he caught four passes for 57 receiving yards during the Raiders' 24-17 win over the New York Giants. He suffered a concussion in Week 14 and was placed on injured reserve on December 23, 2017. Walford completed the  season with nine receptions for 80 yards and no touchdowns.

On March 27, 2018, Walford was released by the Raiders.

New York Jets
On April 2, 2018, the New York Jets claimed Walford off waivers. On September 1, 2018, the Jets released Walford.

Indianapolis Colts
On November 28, 2018, Walford was signed by the Indianapolis Colts. On December 7, the Colts released Walford.

New York Jets (second stint)
On December 27, 2018, Walford was signed by the New York Jets.

Miami Dolphins
On March 13, 2019, Walford signed a one-year contract with the Miami Dolphins. He was released on August 27, 2019. He was re-signed on October 30, 2019.

NFL statistics

Regular season

Postseason

Personal life
On May 3, 2016, it was reported that Walford suffered a knee injury in an ATV accident. He was unable to participate in spring practices and rejoined the team during the start of training camp.

References

External links
 Miami Hurricanes bio 

1991 births
Living people
American football tight ends
Indianapolis Colts players
Miami Dolphins players
Miami Hurricanes football players
New York Jets players
Oakland Raiders players
People from Belle Glade, Florida
Players of American football from Florida
Sportspeople from the Miami metropolitan area